The Michael Vick Project is an American docu-series following American football player Michael Vick, executive produced by James DuBose. The ten-part docu-series premiered on February 2, 2010, on BET, and aired its last episode on April 6, 2010. It chronicled the widely publicized and criticized plummet of the NFL's one-time highest paid player.

Critical reception
Hank Stuverer, in a review for The Washington Post which was reprinted in the Boston Globe, gave the series a mixed reception. He described it as "far from a defensive vanity project" but thought that it needed "an objective outsider who will ask tougher questions".

References

External links
 BET Shows - The Michael Vick Project

BET original programming
2010 American television series debuts
2010s American reality television series
African-American reality television series
2010 American television series endings